Colonel David Collins (3 March 1756 – 24 March 1810) was a British Marine officer who was appointed as Judge-Advocate to the new colony being established in Botany Bay. He sailed with Governor Arthur Phillip on the First Fleet to establish a penal colony at what is now Sydney. He became secretary to the first couple of Governors, later being appointed to start a secondary colony where he founded the city of Hobart as the founding Lieutenant Governor of Van Diemen's Land (later becoming the state of Tasmania).

Early life and military career
David Collins was born 3 March 1756 in London, the third and oldest surviving child of Arthur Tooker Collins (1718–1793), an officer of marines (later major-general) and Henrietta Caroline  (died 1807) of King's County, Ireland. His grandfather Arthur Collins (1684–1760) was author of Collins's Peerage of England.

The family lived in Saffron Hill, London, until 1765 when they moved to Devon after his father as a lieutenant colonel was made commandant of the Plymouth division of marines. Collins was educated at Exeter Grammar School, before at the age of 14 joining the marines as an ensign in his fathers division. He was promoted second lieutenant on 20 February 1771. In 1772 Collins was serving aboard the frigate  when it was sent to Denmark to retrieve King George III's sister Queen Caroline Matilda after she was banished from Denmark for an illicit romance.

American Revolutionary War
In March 1775, Collins sailed to Boston, Massachusetts, with two battalions of marines, to help the Governor of Massachusetts Thomas Gage reinforce the town. Collins was named second lieutenant to Captain Thomas Lindsay in the third company of the First Battalion of Marines. On 17 June, Collins took part in General William Howe's bayonet charge and capture of Breed's Hill in the Battle of Bunker Hill to hold the heights of Charlestown. He was promoted to first lieutenant the following week.

On 17 March 1776, the British evacuated from Boston to Halifax, Nova Scotia. Here he met Maria Stuart Procter, the daughter of Captain Charles Procter, whom he married on 13 June 1777. Collins's battalion was recalled to England in 1777, where Collins became adjutant of the battalion at Chatham. He was promoted captain-lieutenant in August 1779, and captain in July 1780. In February 1781, Collins was posted as captain for a detachment of marines aboard the 74-gun  in the Channel Squadron commanded by Admiral Richard Howe, where he took part in the relief of Gibraltar. In September 1783 Collins was put onto half-pay.

Colonial Administration

New South Wales
In October 1786, after three years on half-pay stationed at Chatham, Collins volunteered for service in the proposed penal colony of New South Wales. On 29 November, and despite a lack of legal training, he was named Judge Advocate for the new colony and chief judge for a military court administering the New South Wales Marine Corps. In May 1787 he sailed aboard the First Fleet, reaching Sydney Cove in January 1788.

In June or July 1788, Governor Phillip appointed Collins as the Secretary to the Governor, or Secretary to the Colony as the position was sometimes called. Collins filled the three roles of Secretary, Judge Advocate and Lieutenant Governor until he left the colony for England in 1796.

Victoria and Tasmania

Collins also established the first, short-lived settlement in what is now the state of Victoria at Sullivan Bay on Port Phillip in 1803. He sailed from England in April aboard , arriving at Port Phillip in October to found a penal colony. After landing at Sullivan Bay near present-day Sorrento, he sent First Lieutenant James Hingston Tuckey of the Calcutta to explore Port Phillip. Tuckey's report, and Collins' own dissatisfaction with the site chosen, prompted him to write to Governor King, seeking permission to remove the settlement. When King agreed, Collins decided to move the colony to the Derwent River, on the island of Van Diemen's Land (Tasmania). He arrived there in February 1804 on Ocean, and established what would become the town of Hobart.

Collins left no published account of his work as Lieutenant-Governor at Port Phillip, nor later as the founder of Hobart.

Legacy
Collins has given his name to Collinsvale in Tasmania, Collins Street, Melbourne, Collins Parade, Sorrento (adjacent to the site of the failed settlement) and Collins Street, Hobart. At Exeter Grammar School, now known as Exeter School, where he was educated, there is a house named after him.

Collins was portrayed by David Dawson in the 2015 TV series Banished.

See also
First Fleet
Journals of the First Fleet

Citations

References

Further reading

Richards, D. Manning (2012). Destiny in Sydney: An epic novel of convicts, Aborigines, and Chinese embroiled in the birth of Sydney, Australia. First book in Sydney series. Washington DC: Aries Books. 
Robson, L. L. (1983). A History of Tasmania. Volume I. Van Diemen's Land From the Earliest Times to 1855. Melbourne: Oxford University Press. .

External links

 
 

Governors of Tasmania
1756 births
1810 deaths
18th-century English people
19th-century English people
19th-century Australian public servants
Politicians from London
Military personnel from London
People educated at Exeter School
Royal Marines officers
Australian penal colony administrators
Royal Navy personnel of the American Revolutionary War
Settlers of Melbourne
History of Victoria (Australia)
Colony of New South Wales judges
Judge Advocates of New South Wales
19th-century Australian judges
First Fleet